The 2014 North Carolina Central Eagles football team represented North Carolina Central University in the 2014 NCAA Division I FCS football season. They were led by first-year head coach Jerry Mack. The Eagles played their home games at O'Kelly–Riddick Stadium. They were a member of the Mid-Eastern Athletic Conference (EAC). They finished the season 7–5, 6–2 in MEAC play to finish in a five-way tie for the MEAC championship. However, they did not earn the conference's automatic bid to the FCS playoffs and did not receive an at-large bid.

Schedule

Source: Schedule

References

North Carolina Central
North Carolina Central Eagles football seasons
Mid-Eastern Athletic Conference football champion seasons
North Carolina Central Eagles football